Microurania is an extinct genus of therapsids from the Middle Permian first named and described by Mikhaïl Ivakhnenko. It is known from a single partial skull found in the region of Orenburg, Russia. According to Kammerer, 2011, it likely represents the remains of a juvenile dinocephalian.

Skull
Microurania was small, with a skull of about 5 cm in length, though the postorbital portion of the skull is missing. It has a leaf-like postcanine tooth similar to the one on Phthinosuchus. It was probably omnivorous.

See also
 List of therapsids

References 

The main groups of non-mammalian synapsids at Mikko's Phylogeny Archive

External links
Microurania minima at Palaeocritti

Dinocephalians
Prehistoric therapsid genera
Fossils of Russia
Fossil taxa described in 1996